Sarsai Nawar is a large village in the Etawah district of Uttar Pradesh, India.

Geography 
It has an average elevation of 153 metres (501 feet). It is about 140 km away from historic city of Taj Mahal, Agra and 190 km from State capital Lucknow.

Demographics 
According to the 2011 census the population was 10,762, comprising 5,751 males and 5,011 females giving a sex ratio of 871. There were
1,641 children aged 0–6 and 2,541 members of scheduled castes.  Literacy was 75.13% with male literacy at 84.33% and female 64.51%.

Culture

Hajari Mahadev Temple is a Hindu temple located here.

Transport

Road 
Sarsai Nawar is well connected to the Sarsai Road. network. It is 300 km from New Delhi the Agra Lucknow Expressway. goes to Takha Tehsil bus stand in Sarsai Nawar UPSRTC Services.

Railway 

Sarsai Nawar has no railway station.  The nearest are at Etawah Junction railway station & Ekdil

Airport 
Saifai Airstrip is 20 km from the village, but has no scheduled flights.  International airport at Lucknow and domestic airport at Agra are nearest operational airports.

Education 
Schools & Colleges in Sarsai Nawar are either government run schools or private schools. The schools are affiliated to the All-India Indian Certificate of Secondary Education (ICSE) or the Central Board of Secondary Education (CBSE) boards.

 Lala Siyaram Inter College – Private School
 Kidzee Play School
 Government Sr. Sec. School Sarsai Nawar
 SS Memorial College

Tourism 

Sarsai Nawar Wetland is a bird sanctuary and a protected area.

References

External links

 
Villages in Etawah district